Christian Leberecht von Prøck (1718-1780) was a Danish baron. 
He served as Governor-General of the Danish West Indies colonies from 1756–1766. In 1768, Pröck became a diocese commander over Iceland and the Faroe Islands. He died on 4 September 1780 in Copenhagen.

In 1759, Patrick Browne ex Carl Linnaeus published Prockia, a genus of flowering plants from Central America, and South America, in the willow family, Salicaceae. Then in 1886, botanist Baill. published Prockiopsis, a genus of flowering plants from Madagascar, belonging to the family Achariaceae and both genera were named in Christian Leberecht von Prøck's honour.

References

Governors of the Danish West Indies
Year of birth missing
Year of death missing
Danish nobility
18th century in the Danish West Indies
18th-century Danish politicians